Kareem Streete-Thompson (born March 30, 1973) is a Caymanian-American athlete specializing in the long jump and the 100 metres. He was born in Ithaca, New York.

Although born in the United States, he lived his first 18 years in the Cayman Islands. Originally he represented the Cayman Islands, then the United States, and then from 1999 the Cayman Islands again.

Two times in the role, he  was awarded the Austin Sealy Trophy for the
most outstanding athlete of the 1989 CARIFTA Games and 1990 CARIFTA Games.

In the 2004 Summer Olympics, he participated in the 100 metres, achieving a second place and a season's best time in the heat from which he qualified, before exiting the competition in the second round with a fifth-placed finish. In the long jump competition, he did not qualify for the final.

Achievements

References

 
 Picture of Kareem Streete-Thompson

1973 births
Living people
Sportspeople from Ithaca, New York
Track and field athletes from New York (state)
American male long jumpers
Caymanian long jumpers
Caymanian male sprinters
American male sprinters
African-American male track and field athletes
Athletes (track and field) at the 1992 Summer Olympics
Athletes (track and field) at the 2000 Summer Olympics
Athletes (track and field) at the 2004 Summer Olympics
Athletes (track and field) at the 2008 Summer Olympics
Olympic athletes of the Cayman Islands
Athletes (track and field) at the 1999 Pan American Games
Athletes (track and field) at the 2003 Pan American Games
Pan American Games silver medalists for the Cayman Islands
Pan American Games medalists in athletics (track and field)
Athletes (track and field) at the 1990 Commonwealth Games
Athletes (track and field) at the 2002 Commonwealth Games
Athletes (track and field) at the 2006 Commonwealth Games
Commonwealth Games bronze medallists for the Cayman Islands
Commonwealth Games medallists in athletics
American emigrants to the Cayman Islands
World Athletics Championships athletes for the Cayman Islands
World Athletics Championships athletes for the United States
Universiade medalists in athletics (track and field)
Goodwill Games medalists in athletics
Universiade gold medalists for the United States
Medalists at the 1993 Summer Universiade
Competitors at the 1994 Goodwill Games
Medalists at the 1999 Pan American Games
21st-century African-American sportspeople
20th-century African-American sportspeople
Medallists at the 2002 Commonwealth Games